The 2018 NCAA Division III baseball tournament was played at the end of the 2018 NCAA Division III baseball season to determine the 43rd national champion of college baseball at the NCAA Division III level. The tournament concluded with eight teams competing at Neuroscience Group Field at Fox Cities Stadium in Grand Chute, Wisconsin for the championship. Eight regional tournaments were held to determine the participants in the World Series. Regional tournaments were contested in double-elimination format, with three regions consisting of six teams, and five consisting of eight, for a total of 58 teams participating in the tournament, up from 56 in 2017.

This was the final DIII World Series contested with the current regional format and World Series location.

Bids

Automatic bids 
Source: NCAA

At-large bids

Pool B

Pool C

Regionals
Bold indicates winner.

New England Regional
Whitehouse Field-Harwich, MA (Host: Massachusetts Maritime Academy)

Central Regional
GCS Ballpark-Sauget, IL (Host: St. Louis Intercollegiate Athletic Conference)

South Regional
Ting Park-Holly Springs, NC (Host: William Peace University)

Mid-Atlantic Regional
WellSpan Park – York, PA (Host: Middle Atlantic Conferences)

Midwest Regional
Frank Wade Municipal Stadium-Duluth, MN (Host: The College of Saint Scholastica)

New York Regional
Leo Pinckney Field at Falcon Park-Auburn, NY (Host: State University of New York College at Cortland)

Mideast Regional
Nicolay Field-Adrian, MI (Host: Adrian College)

West Regional
Avista Stadium-Spokane, WA (Host: Whitworth College/Spokane Sports Commission)

World Series
Neuroscience Group Field at Fox Cities Stadium-Grand Chute, WI (Host: University of Wisconsin-Oshkosh/Lawrence University/Fox Cities Convention and Visitors Bureau)

References

NCAA Division III Baseball Tournament
Tournament
NCAA Division III baseball tournament